The 13th Annual Transgender Erotica Awards are a scheduled pornographic awards event recognizing the best in transgender pornography form the previous year from  October 2, 2019 to October 31, 2020. Pre-nominations were open from November 3 to November 13, 2020.

The public-at-large was able to suggest nominees using an online form. Nominees were announced on December 24, 2020, online on the theteashow.com website or 16 awards, with the following awards having the winner announced without nominees;Transcendence Award, Lifetime Achievement Award, Gender X Model of the Year, Kink's Kinkiest TGirl Domme, Black-TGirls.com Model of the Year, Chaturbate TS Performer of the Year, Pornhub Model of the Year, The Fan Choice Award voting is opened in 2021, with the winners announced after public nominations and voting.

Winners and nominees
The nominations for the 13th Transgender Erotica Awards were announced online on December 24, 2020, online on the theteashow.com website. The winners are scheduled to be announced during the awards on March 7, 2021. On December 4, 2020, it was announced that the award show would be held as an online production and on February 9, 2021, it was announced the ceremony would be broadcast on Pornhub. The awards were presented with winners notified in advance after signing non-disclosure agreements. Each winner gave a pre-recorded acceptance speech. Award trophies were mailed out to recipients after the award show was broadcast.

Awards
Winners are listed first, highlighted in boldface.

References

Transgender Erotica Awards
Pornographic film awards
21st-century awards
American pornographic film awards
Annual events in the United States
Awards established in 2008
Culture of Los Angeles
Adult industry awards